Paul Felder (born April 25, 1984) is an American retired professional mixed martial artist and color commentator for UFC. He competed in the Lightweight division in the Ultimate Fighting Championship (UFC). A professional since 2011, Felder also fought for the Cage Fury Fighting Championships.

Background
He is of Irish and German descent. He began training in martial arts at age 12, starting with Tae Kwon Do and Karate at Zhang Sah. Felder competed in the AAU Junior Olympic Games for Tae Kwon Do with his cousin Niko Portillo, who was the main inspiration for Felder's fighting career. Felder attended Ridley High School in Folsom, Pennsylvania and later the University of the Arts in Philadelphia, for acting, graduating in 2008. 

During college, Felder began training in Muay Thai before later transitioning to mixed martial arts. Due to his karate background, he was given the nickname "The Irish Dragon", a reference to his Irish heritage and fellow karate practitioner Lyoto "The Dragon" Machida. Felder initially pushed back against the nickname, but it caught on and he stuck with it. After fellow UFC lightweight fighter Conor McGregor commented that Felder's surname was of German origin, Felder joked in January 2021 that he would use the nickname "The German Dragon" if he ever fought McGregor.

Mixed martial arts career

Early career
Felder compiled an amateur MMA record of 3–1 and began his professional mixed martial arts career in 2011. Felder competed entirely in his native Mid-Atlantic states, with most fights for the regional promotion Cage Fury Fighting Championships.

Felder ultimately became Lightweight Champion for the promotion, earning the title with a second-round knockout of Marc Stevens. Felder then defended his title once, with a second-round knockout of Craig Johnson, before signing with the UFC in August 2014.

Ultimate Fighting Championship
Felder made his promotional debut on October 4, 2014 at UFC Fight Night 54 where he faced Jason Saggo. Felder won the fight by split decision.

Felder was briefly scheduled to face Johnny Case on January 18, 2015 at UFC Fight Night 59. However, Felder was tabbed as a replacement against Danny Castillo on January 3, 2015 at UFC 182, replacing Rustam Khabilov. Felder defeated Castillo via second-round knockout, which earned Felder a Performance of the Night award.

Felder was expected to face Jim Miller on April 18, 2015 at UFC on Fox 15. However, Felder pulled out of the fight citing a knee injury and was replaced by Beneil Dariush.

Felder faced Edson Barboza on July 25, 2015 at UFC on Fox 16, replacing an injured Myles Jury. He lost the fight by unanimous decision. Both participants earned Fight of the Night honors. UFC President Dana White said afterwards that the fight "takes Felder to another level".

Felder faced Ross Pearson on September 5, 2015 at UFC 191. He lost the back-and-forth fight by a controversial split decision.

Felder faced Daron Cruickshank on January 17, 2016 at UFC Fight Night 81. He won the fight via submission in the third round.

Felder next faced Josh Burkman on May 29, 2016 at UFC Fight Night 88. He won the fight via unanimous decision.

Felder faced Francisco Trinaldo on September 24, 2016 at UFC Fight Night 95. During the fight, repeated elbows from Trinaldo opened up a large, bloody cut on Felder's face. With a huge cut and blood streaming down Felder's face, the ringside physician waved the fight off at 2:25 of the third round, resulting in a TKO (doctor's stoppage) loss for Felder.

Felder faced Alessandro Ricci on February 19, 2017 at UFC Fight Night 105. He won the fight via TKO in the first round due to a combination of an elbow and punches. The win also earned Felder his second Performance of the Night bonus award.

Felder faced Stevie Ray on July 16, 2017 at UFC Fight Night 113. He won the fight by knockout in the first round after dropping Ray with a knee strike and subsequently finishing him off with a barrage of ground and pound. The win also earned Felder his third Performance of the Night bonus award.

Felder was expected to face Al Iaquinta on December 2, 2017 at UFC 218. However, Iaquinta pulled out of the fight on October 31 citing an injury and was replaced by Charles Oliveira. Felder won the fight in the second round, finishing Oliveira via TKO with a series of elbows. The bout with Iaquinta was rescheduled for UFC 223. However on the day of the weigh-ins, Max Holloway was declared unfit to fight Khabib Nurmagomedov, so Iaquinta replaced him.

Felder was scheduled to face James Vick on July 14, 2018 at UFC Fight Night 133. However, on June 27, Vick was pulled from that fight in favor of a matchup against Justin Gaethje the following month at UFC Fight Night 135. On June 28, it was announced that Felder would replace Yancy Medeiros in a Welterweight bout against Mike Perry at UFC 226 on July 7. He lost the fight via split decision.

Felder faced James Vick on February 17, 2019 at UFC on ESPN 1. He won the fight by unanimous decision.

Felder faced Edson Barboza in a rematch on September 7, 2019 at UFC 242. Felder won by controversial split decision. 13 out of 16 MMA media outlets scored the bout in favor of Barboza.

As the first bout of his new, multi-fight deal Felder faced Dan Hooker on February 23, 2020 at UFC Fight Night: Felder vs. Hooker. He lost the fight via a controversial split decision. 12 out of 17 media journalists scored the fight for Felder. This fight earned him a Fight of the Night award. After the fight Felder mentioned in his post-fight speech it may have been his last fight, however he confirmed in an interview with Ariel Helwani that he was not retiring, but only wants to take on fights which entice him.

In a quick turnaround, it was announced that Felder stepped in on five days notice to replace Islam Makhachev and face former UFC Lightweight Champion Rafael dos Anjos on November 14, 2020, while headlining UFC Fight Night: Felder vs. dos Anjos. Felder was originally scheduled to work the event as a color-commentator. Despite a dominant performance from dos Anjos, Felder lost the bout by split decision. This fight earned him the Fight of the Night award. Subsequently, Felder signed a new, multi-fight contract with the UFC.

On May 22, 2021, while working as a commentator for the broadcast of UFC Fight Night: Font vs. Garbrandt, Felder announced his retirement from mixed martial arts competition.

Personal life
Felder has two daughters, Aisling (born 2015) and Ruby (born 2022).

Felder made his UFC color commentary debut on September 16, 2017 at UFC Fight Night 116 in Pittsburgh, Pennsylvania. He then made his UFC pay-per-view commentary debut on November 3, 2018 at UFC 230 at Madison Square Garden in New York City, New York.

Championships and accomplishments
Cage Fury Fighting Championships
CFFC Lightweight Championship (One time)
One successful title defense vs. Craig Johnson 
Ultimate Fighting Championship
Performance of the Night (Three times) 
Fight of the Night (Three times) 

MMAJunkie.com
2015 January Knockout of the Month vs. Danny Castillo 
2019 September Fight of the Month vs. Edson Barboza
2020 February Fight of the Month vs. Dan Hooker
CombatPress.com
 2018 Broadcast Analyst of the Year
2021 Broadcast Analyst of the Year

Mixed martial arts record

|-
|Loss
|align=center|17–6
|Rafael dos Anjos
|Decision (split)
|UFC Fight Night: Felder vs. dos Anjos
|
|align=center|5
|align=center|5:00
|Las Vegas, Nevada, United States
|
|-
|Loss
|align=center|17–5
|Dan Hooker
|Decision (split)
|UFC Fight Night: Felder vs. Hooker
|
|align=center|5
|align=center|5:00
|Auckland, New Zealand
|
|-
|Win
|align=center|17–4
|Edson Barboza
|Decision (split)
|UFC 242
|
|align=center|3
|align=center|5:00
|Abu Dhabi, United Arab Emirates
|
|-
|Win
|align=center|16–4
|James Vick
|Decision (unanimous)
|UFC on ESPN: Ngannou vs. Velasquez
|
|align=center|3
|align=center|5:00
|Phoenix, Arizona, United States
|
|- 
|Loss
|align=center|15–4
|Mike Perry
|Decision (split)
|UFC 226
|
|align=center|3
|align=center|5:00
|Las Vegas, Nevada, United States
|
|- 
|Win
|align=center|15–3
|Charles Oliveira
|TKO (elbows)
|UFC 218
|
|align=center|2
|align=center|4:06
|Detroit, Michigan, United States
|
|-
|Win
|align=center|14–3
|Stevie Ray
|KO (elbows)
|UFC Fight Night: Nelson vs. Ponzinibbio
|
|align=center|1
|align=center|3:57
|Glasgow, Scotland
|
|-
|Win
|align=center|13–3
|Alessandro Ricci
|TKO (elbow and punches)
|UFC Fight Night: Lewis vs. Browne
|
|align=center|1
|align=center|4:44
|Halifax, Nova Scotia, Canada
|
|-
|Loss
|align=center|12–3
|Francisco Trinaldo
|TKO (doctor stoppage)
|UFC Fight Night: Cyborg vs. Länsberg
|
|align=center|3
|align=center|2:25
|Brasília, Brazil
|  
|-
|Win
|align=center|12–2
|Josh Burkman
|Decision (unanimous)
|UFC Fight Night: Almeida vs. Garbrandt
|
|align=center|3
|align=center|5:00
|Las Vegas, Nevada, United States
|  
|-
|Win
|align=center|11–2
|Daron Cruickshank
|Submission (rear-naked choke)
|UFC Fight Night: Dillashaw vs. Cruz
|
|align=center|3
|align=center|3:56
|Boston, Massachusetts, United States
|
|-
|Loss 
|align=center| 10–2 
|Ross Pearson
|Decision (split) 
|UFC 191
|
|align=center|3
|align=center|5:00
|Las Vegas, Nevada, United States
|
|-
|Loss
|align=center|10–1
|Edson Barboza
|Decision (unanimous)
|UFC on Fox: Dillashaw vs. Barão 2
|
|align=center|3
|align=center|5:00
|Chicago, Illinois, United States
|
|-
|Win
|align=center|10–0
|Danny Castillo
|KO (spinning back fist)
|UFC 182
|
|align=center|2
|align=center|2:09
|Las Vegas, Nevada, United States
|
|-
|Win
|align=center|9–0
|Jason Saggo
|Decision (split)
|UFC Fight Night: MacDonald vs. Saffiedine
|
|align=center|3
|align=center|5:00
|Halifax, Nova Scotia, Canada
| 
|-
|Win
|align=center|8–0
|Craig Johnson
|KO (spinning heel kick)
|CFFC 38: Felder vs. Johnson
|
|align=center|2
|align=center|3:44
|Atlantic City, New Jersey, United States
|
|-
|Win
|align=center|7–0
|Marc Stevens
|TKO (punches)
|CFFC 33: Felder vs. Stevens
|
|align=center|2
|align=center|4:03
|Philadelphia, Pennsylvania, United States
|
|-
|Win
|align=center|6–0
|Julian Lane
|Decision (unanimous)
|CFFC 28: Brenneman vs. Baker
|
|align=center|3
|align=center|5:00
|Atlantic City, New Jersey, United States
| 
|-
|Win
|align=center|5–0
|Corey Bleaken
|Decision (unanimous)
|CFFC 24: Sullivan vs. Becker
|
|align=center|3
|align=center|5:00
|Atlantic City, New Jersey, United States
| 
|-
|Win
|align=center|4–0
|Ricky Nuno
|TKO (elbows)
|CFFC 20: Heckman vs. Martinez
|
|align=center|1
|align=center|2:15
|King of Prussia, Pennsylvania, United States
| 
|-
|Win
|align=center|3–0
|Khama Worthy
|TKO (punches)
|Pinnacle FC: Pittsburgh Challenge Series 1
|
|align=center|1
|align=center|1:10
|Pittsburgh, Pennsylvania, United States
| 
|-
|Win
|align=center|2–0
|Judah Ciervo
|TKO (doctor stoppage)
|XFE: Cage Wars 14
|
|align=center|2
|align=center|5:00
|Chester, Pennsylvania, United States
| 
|-
|Win
|align=center|1–0
|Mtume Goodrum
|TKO (knees)
|CFFC 12: Pollard vs. Soto
|
|align=center|2
|align=center|2:31
|Atlantic City, New Jersey, United States
|

See also
 List of male mixed martial artists

References

External links
 
 

1985 births
American color commentators
American male karateka
American male mixed martial artists
American male taekwondo practitioners
American Muay Thai practitioners
American people of Irish descent
American practitioners of Brazilian jiu-jitsu
Lightweight mixed martial artists
Living people
Mixed martial artists from Pennsylvania
Mixed martial artists utilizing Brazilian jiu-jitsu
Mixed martial artists utilizing Muay Thai
Mixed martial artists utilizing Shotokan
Mixed martial artists utilizing taekwondo
People from Ridley Township, Pennsylvania
Sportspeople from Philadelphia
Ridley High School alumni
Ultimate Fighting Championship male fighters